Phanerophlebia is a genus of ferns in the family Dryopteridaceae, subfamily Dryopteridoideae, according to the Pteridophyte Phylogeny Group classification of 2016 (PPG I).

Taxonomy
Phanerophlebia was first described by Carl Presl in 1836.

Species
, the Checklist of Ferns and Lycophytes of the World and Plants of the World Online recognized the following species:
Phanerophlebia auriculata Underw.
Phanerophlebia aurita Fée
Phanerophlebia gastonyi Yatsk.
Phanerophlebia haitiensis C.Chr.
Phanerophlebia juglandifolia (Humb. & Bonpl. ex Willd.) J.Sm.
Phanerophlebia macrosora (Baker) Underw.
Phanerophlebia nobilis (Schltdl. & Cham.) C.Presl
Phanerophlebia pumila (M.Martens & Galeotti) Fée
Phanerophlebia remotispora E.Fourn.
Phanerophlebia umbonata Underw.

References

Dryopteridaceae
Fern genera